"Children Say" is a 1987 song by Level 42. Written by Mark King, Mike Lindup and Phil Gould, it was the final single to be issued from their album, Running in the Family. The song made the top 30 in the UK, and the top 10 in the Netherlands, and followed a series of successes with the hits "Lessons in Love", "Running in the Family", "To Be With You Again" and "It's Over".

Promo video 
The video of the song was the first of Level 42's career not to feature the brothers Phil and Boon Gould, who had recently left the band. The video was shot in Paris. The Gould brothers are also missing from the sleeve of the single.

Charts

References

Level 42 songs
Songs written by Mark King (musician)
Songs written by Phil Gould (musician)
Songs written by Mike Lindup
1987 singles
1987 songs